Mayor of the Town is a radio comedy-drama in the United States. From September 6, 1942, to July 3, 1949, it was broadcast at various times on ABC, CBS, Mutual and NBC.

Format
Lionel Barrymore starred as the unnamed mayor of Springdale, a community typical of those in other radio programs of the era, such as Summerfield in The Great Gildersleeve and River's End in Dr. Christian. Stories dealt with typical small-town situations that involved the mayor. The mayor's housekeeper, Marilly (Agnes Moorehead), and his ward, Butch (Conrad Binyon) usually played key roles in episodes. One old-time radio reference noted the similarity of Mayor of the Town'''s plots to those of The Great Gildersleeve, citing "the grumbling but kindly mayor interacting with a number of interesting town characters."

A review of the program in the trade publication Billboard had little positive to say. The writer opined that except for selling the sponsor's product, Mayor of the Town "is otherwise devoid of merit." By way of explanation, he added, "From its very inception, almost every phase of 'Mayor of the Town' is the most palpable of contrivance; stock characters, stock plot and the lowest grade of corn."

In contrast, radio historian John Dunning commented that Mayor of the Town "gave a realistic portrait of rural living." "Often the stories were coming-of-age pieces," he wrote, "focusing on the mayor's special relationship with Butch."

Personnel
In addition to Barrymore, Moorehead and Binyon, actors on Mayor of the Town included Gloria McMillan (Sharlee Bronson, Butch's girlfriend), Priscilla Lyon (Holly-Ann, the mayor's granddaughter) and Bill Wright (the sheriff). Dunning noted that Barrymore's involvement went beyond his acting. "He insisted on meticulous attention to detail, even though others were in charge of production. Barrymore had a way of knowing what lines were wrong and why."

The announcer was Frank Martin. Wilbur Hatch led the orchestra. Music directors were Gordon Jenkins and Bernard Katz.  Con Maffie played organ for the show.

Arthur Trask was producer and director; Jack Van Nostrand. also directed. Writers were Howard Blake, Leonard St. Clair, Howard Breslin, Charles Tazwell, Jean Holloway and Erna Lazarus.

 Schedule 
On January 2, 1949, the program moved to Mutual, where it was broadcast on Sundays at 7:30 p.m. Eastern Time.

Television version

In 1954, a syndicated television version of Mayor of the Town'' aired in the United States. It starred Thomas Mitchell as Mayor Thomas Russell, Kathleen Freeman as Marilly, and David Saber as Butch.

References

External links

Audio
 Streaming episodes from Old Time Radio Researchers Group library
 One set of streaming episodes from Internet Archive
 Another set of streaming episodes from Internet Archive

Logs
 Episodic log from RadioGOLDINdex
 Episodic log from Jerry Haendiges Vintage Radio Logs

Script
 Script for "A Christmas Carol" on Mayor of the Town

1940s American radio programs
American radio dramas
CBS Radio programs
Mutual Broadcasting System programs
NBC radio programs
ABC radio programs
Radio programs adapted into television shows
1942 radio programme debuts
1949 radio programme endings